Julius "Jules" Levin (3 February 1922 – 16 May 1988) was the last Socialist Labor Party of America candidate for United States President in the 1976 Presidential election; his running mate was Constance Blomen. It was after Levin's poor showing in this election that the SLP chose to forgo competing in Presidential elections (and later all elections as their membership dwindled). Levin also ran for Governor of New Jersey five times unsuccessfully; the party (headquartered in New Jersey) had run candidates for governor, starting in 1898.  Levin also ran for Senator from New Jersey four times: 1966, 1972, 1982, 1984 and for the New Jersey General Assembly in 1975.

References
 
 The Political Graveyard: Index to Politicians: Levin

1922 births
1988 deaths
Candidates in the 1976 United States presidential election
Socialist Labor Party of America presidential nominees
Socialist Labor Party of America politicians from New Jersey
20th-century American politicians